Mehmet Suphi Kula (1881; Monastir (Bitola) – October 19, 1948; Ankara) was an officer of the Ottoman Army and the general of the Turkish Army.

See also
List of high-ranking commanders of the Turkish War of Independence

Sources

1881 births
1948 deaths
People from Bitola
Ottoman Military Academy alumni
Ottoman Army officers
Ottoman military personnel of the Balkan Wars
Ottoman military personnel of World War I
Turkish military personnel of the Greco-Turkish War (1919–1922)
Recipients of the Medal of Independence with Red-Green Ribbon (Turkey)
Turkish Army generals
Burials at Turkish State Cemetery
Macedonian Turks